Schismatogobius is a genus of fish in the subfamily Gobionellinae. They are native to southern and eastern Asia, Australia and the Pacific Islands. Adults dwell in freshwater habitat such as streams and rivers, where they live along the sand and gravel substrates.

These fish are not always obvious in the habitat, because they are small and cryptic. They lack scales and have variable color patterns, with no two individuals of a given species alike. Compared to those of females, the jaws of males are "hugely large".

Species
The 20 recognized species in this genus are:
 Schismatogobius alleni Keith, Lord & Larson, 2017 
 Schismatogobius ampluvinculus I. S. Chen, K. T. Shao & L. S. Fang, 1995
 Schismatogobius arscuttoli Keith, Lord & Hubert, 2017 
 Schismatogobius baitabag Keith, Lord & Larson, 2017 
 Schismatogobius bruynisi de Beaufort, 1912
 Schismatogobius bussoni Keith, Hubert, Limmon & Darhuddin, 2017 
 Schismatogobius deraniyagalai Kottelat & Pethiyagoda, 1989 (redneck goby)
 Schismatogobius essi Keith, Lord & Larson, 2017 
 Schismatogobius fuligimentus I. S. Chen, Séret, Pöllabauer & K. T. Shao, 2001
 Schismatogobius hoesei Keith, Lord & Larson, 2017 
 Schismatogobius insignus (Herre, 1927)
 Schismatogobius marmoratus (W. K. H. Peters, 1868)
 Schismatogobius mondo Keith, Lord & Larson, 2017 
 Schismatogobius ninja Maeda, Saeki & Satoh, 2017 
 Schismatogobius risdawatiae Keith, Darhuddin, Sukmono & Hubert, 2017 
 Schismatogobius saurii Keith, Lord, Hadiaty & Hubert, 2017 
 Schismatogobius tiola Keith, Lord & Larson, 2017 
 Schismatogobius tuimanua Keith, Lord & Larson, 2017 
 Schismatogobius vanuatuensis Keith, Marquet & R. E. Watson, 2004 (Vanuatu goby)
 Schismatogobius vitiensis A. P. Jenkins & Boseto, 2005

References

 
Gobionellinae
Taxa named by Lieven Ferdinand de Beaufort